Abdulmajid Salimovich Dostiev (born 1946) is a Tajikistan politician and diplomat.

Biography

Born in Bokhtar District in 1946, Dostiev served in the Soviet Army from 1966 until 1968 before pursuing a career in agriculture. Dostiev worked on a kolkhoz (communal farm) and went on to study entomology at the Agricultural University of Tajikistan, graduating in 1974. In 1977 he became the chief agronomist at the Qurghonteppa Department of Agriculture, and in 1980 he became head of that department.

In 1992, as the Soviet Union collapsed, Dostiev joined the Sitodi Melli armed militia of the Popular Front, becoming secretary of the regional executive committee, and in November of that year was appointed to the Tajik Supreme Soviet as first deputy. The next year he founded the People's Party of Tajikistan (now the People's Democratic Party of Tajikistan), serving as chair until 1998.

In 1995 he was elected to the Supreme Assembly (Majlisi Oli), and in 1996 he was appointed deputy chair of the assembly, a position he held for four years. He also served as deputy of the Commission for National Reconciliation in 1997. In 2000, he was elected to the assembly's lower chamber, where he served as deputy parliamentary chair.

Since December 2006, he has been the Ambassador Extraordinary and Plenipotentiary of the Republic of Tajikistan to the Russian Federation.

References 

People's Democratic Party of Tajikistan politicians
1946 births
Living people
People from Khatlon Region
Ambassadors of Tajikistan to Russia
Ambassadors of Tajikistan to Ukraine